Sankey railway station, also known as Sankey for Penketh, is a railway station in the west of Warrington, Cheshire, England, serving the Great Sankey, Penketh and Whittle Hall areas of the town.  The station, and all trains serving it, are operated by Northern Trains. It is designated by English Heritage as a Grade II listed building.

History

The station was opened as Sankey for passengers and goods on 1 May 1874.

The station is located in a cutting where the line is bridged by what is now Station Road. The main station building is of the "common twin-pavilion type adopted by the CLC" with a larger, two-storey, projecting pavilion forming a house and a smaller single-storey one. Linking them is an entrance hall, ticket office and three-bay iron-arcaded waiting shelter. The building is decorated with elaborately fretted bargeboards. The station was equipped with a carved stone drinking fountain.

It had two platforms, both accessed by steps down from the road overbridge, the Liverpool bound platform could also be accessed from the road access to the station building. There was a goods yard to the south of the lines and west of the station. The goods yard was able to accommodate most types of goods including several cattle pens for livestock, it was equipped with a five-ton crane. 

During 1904 the station was renamed Sankey for Penketh. 

The station closed to goods traffic on 5 November 1962, except for a private siding, which has subsequently also closed.

Facilities
The main station building is used as a waiting room, though part of the building is a house and another part disused.  Passengers have little shelter available when the main building is closed and seats are only available on the Manchester bound platform, which has a shelter.  

The station is unstaffed. There is a car park outside and the former goods yard has been used for building houses. The station was upgraded in May 2013 with automated announcements and in 2016, digital information screens were added.  Step-free access is available to both platforms.

Services
Prior to the opening of the nearby Warrington West in 2019, services departed Sankey for Penketh approximately hourly in each direction; however since the opening of the new station, Sankey for Penketh now only has two services a day in each direction, one in each direction in the morning. The 07:45 towards Liverpool Lime Street and the 08:20 towards Manchester Oxford Road. There is one in each direction in the evening, the 17:52 towards Manchester Oxford Road, and the 17:55 towards Liverpool Lime Street.

See also
Listed buildings in Great Sankey

References

Bibliography

External links

Grade II listed buildings in Cheshire
Railway stations in Warrington
DfT Category E stations
Former Cheshire Lines Committee stations
Railway stations in Great Britain opened in 1874
Northern franchise railway stations
Grade II listed railway stations